Dipali Saha is an Indian  politician belonging to All India Trinamool Congress. She was elected as a legislator of the West Bengal Legislative Assembly from Sonamukhi in  2011.

References

Living people
West Bengal MLAs 2011–2016
Trinamool Congress politicians from West Bengal
Women in West Bengal politics
Year of birth missing (living people)
21st-century Indian women politicians